The A519 is a road in the Midlands, United Kingdom.

Route 
It that runs between Newcastle-under-Lyme, Staffordshire and Newport, Shropshire.

At Newport it meets the A518 and A41.  It heads broadly north, passing via Eccleshall, junction 15 of the M6 motorway, and then meets the A53 and various other roads in Newcastle-under-Lyme town centre.

The road follows the first part of the route of the medieval road from Shrewsbury to York, which passed through the ancient Forest of Lyme.  Prior to Tudor times, this was the only major highway from the West Midlands to the North.

References 

Transport in Shropshire
Transport in Staffordshire
Roads in England
Newport, Shropshire